West Salem is the name of several places in the United States:

 West Salem, Illinois
 West Salem, Ohio
 West Salem, Salem, Oregon, the Polk County portion of Salem
 West Salem, Wisconsin
 West Salem Township, Mercer County, Pennsylvania

See also
 Salem West Assembly constituency, Tamil Nadu, India
 Salem (disambiguation)
 New Salem (disambiguation)